The peninsulas of China by province or region:

Liaoning
Liaodong Peninsula (辽东半岛)

Shandong
Shandong Peninsula (山东半岛)

Jiangnan region
Nantong peninsula (南通半岛)
Yuantouzhu (鼋头渚)
Chuanshan Peninsula (穿山半岛)
Xiangshan Peninsula (象山半岛)

Guangdong
Leizhou Peninsula (雷州半岛)
Dapeng Peninsula (大鹏半岛)

Hainan Island
Yangpu Peninsula (洋浦半岛)

Hong Kong
Kowloon Peninsula (九龙半岛)
Sai Kung Peninsula (西貢半島)
Clear Water Bay Peninsula (清水灣半島)
Chung Hom Kok (舂坎角)

Macau
Macau Peninsula (澳门半岛)

Peninsulas of China
China
peninsula